Patricia Moran Shepard (October 1, 1945 – January 3, 2013) was an American film actress based in Madrid, Spain. She appeared in more than fifty Spanish, Italian and French films from the 1960s to the 1980s, notably several cult horror films.

Early life 
Shepard was born in Greenville, South Carolina, in 1945. Shepard first arrived in Spain with her father, Air Force Brigadier General Leland C. Shepard Jr., who was stationed at an airbase in Torrejón de Ardoz. She moved to Madrid in 1963 to pursue studies in philosophy. However, she soon began modeling and appearing in Spanish television commercials, including a campaign for a brand of brandy. The roles would lead to more serious acting parts and she remained in Spain for the rest of her life.

Career 
Her early television credits led to a small, debut film role in La ciudad no es para mí (The City is Not For Me) in 1966, which launched her film career. She appeared in more than fifty films in Spain and Italy over the next twenty years, before retiring in 1988.

Shepard played the vampire countess in the iconic 1970 Paul Naschy film, La Noche de Walpurgis (the film which is credited with kickstarting the entire Spanish horror film industry of the 1970s). She also played the lead role in Hannah, Queen of the Vampires (a.k.a. Crypt of the Living Dead, and a 1972 Italian giallo named My Dear Killer. She returned briefly to the horror genre in 1987 with such films as Slugs and Edge of the Axe, then retired in 1988 at age 43.

Personal life 
Shepard married Spanish actor Manuel de Blas in 1967; the couple had met while filming the 1967 movie, Cita en Navarra (A Date in Navarra). They were still married 46 years later at the time of her death.

Her younger sister Judith Chapman is a television actress in the U.S. and had roles in Murder, She Wrote and The Young and the Restless.

Death 
Shepard died from a heart attack at her home in Madrid, Spain, on January 3, 2013, at the age of 67.

Partial filmography 

La ciudad no es para mí (1966) - (uncredited)
Ringo, the Mark of Vengeance (1966) - Chica del saloon
Residencia para espías (1966) - Residence Girl (uncredited)
Lucky, the Inscrutable (1967) - Telefonista (uncredited)
The Fickle Finger of Fate (1967) - Pilar
Cita en Navarra (1967) - Mary
Cruzada en la mar (1968) - Mary
Tinto con amor (1968)
¿Por qué te engaña tu marido? (1969) - Veronique
Sharon vestida de rojo (1969) - Laura
Carola de día, Carola de noche (1969) - Cuca
Las panteras se comen a los ricos (1969) - Fanny
Golpe de mano (Explosión) (1970) - Teresa
Los Monstruos del Terror (1970) (with Paul Naschy) - Ilsa
Un, dos, tres... al escondite inglés (1970) - Patty
Veinte pasos para la muerte (1970) - Deborah
Después de los nueve meses (1970) - Rosario
Las siete vidas del gato (1971) - Lucía / Clotilde / Inés / Carlota / Mariana
The Glass Ceiling (1971) - Julia
The Werewolf vs. The Vampire Woman (aka Walpurgis Night, aka The Werewolf vs. The Vampire Woman, (1971) (with Paul Naschy) - Countess Wandesa Dárvula de Nadasdy
A mí las mujeres, ni fu ni fa (1971) - Ángela
The Legend of Frenchie King (1971) - Petite Pluie
My Dear Killer (1972) - Paola Rossi, the teacher
 The Witches Mountain (1972) – Delia
The Boldest Job in the West (1972) - Lupe
A House Without Boundaries (1972) - Chica del Boheme
Timanfaya (Amor prohibido) (1972)
Escalofrío diabólico (1972) - Vivianne
La curiosa (1973) - Azucena
Crypt of the Living Dead (aka Hannah, Queen of the Vampires) (1973) - Mary
The Man Called Noon (1973) - Peg Cullane
Special Killers (1973) - Simone Mattei
Un casto varón español (1973) - Verónica
Ella (Trágica obsesión) (1973)
Samrtno prolece (1973) - Carmina Rigol
The Killer is One of the Thirteen (1973) (with Paul Naschy) - Lisa Mandel
Watch Out, We're Mad! (1974) - Liza
Las violentas (1974) - Chris
El talón de Aquiles (1974)
Refuge of Fear (1974) - Carol
The Stranger and the Gunfighter (1974) - Russian mistress & Her twin-sister
El monte de las brujas (1975) - Delia
La ciutat cremada (1976) - Sor Engràcia
Todos me llaman Gato (1980) - Jane
Los diablos del mar (1982) - Mrs. Weldom
Banter (1986) - Alicia
Rest in Pieces (1987) - Gertrude Stein
Slugs (1988) - Sue Channing
Edge of the Axe (1988) - Laura Simmons (final film role)

References

External links

1945 births
2013 deaths
Spanish film actresses
Spanish television actresses
American emigrants to Spain
American expatriates in Spain
Actresses from Madrid
Actors from Greenville, South Carolina
Actresses from South Carolina
American film actresses
American television actresses
21st-century American women